Jerónimo Etcheverry (born 11 January 1988, in Montevideo) is an Uruguayan rugby union player. He currently plays as a fly-half and as a fullback for Carrasco Polo Club.

Etcheverry started playing since young for Carrasco Polo Club in Uruguay.

In early 2011, he moved to Italy to play for Rugby Club Valpolicella. He remained three years in the club, till June 2014, when he returned to Uruguay to finish his University Studies on Economy.

International career
Etcheverry made his debut with Teros on 8 November 2008 against United States. He is one of the most promising Uruguayan players of his generation. He has 43 caps for Uruguay, since 2008, with 204 points scored.

He played at the 2011 Rugby World Cup, where Uruguay would be eliminated in the repechage. He would play again in the "Teros" 2015 Rugby World Cup qualifyings, helping his National Team return to the Rugby World Cup after three editions.

Honours
Uruguay U20
World Rugby Under 20 Trophy: 2008

References

External links

1988 births
Living people
Uruguayan people of Basque descent
Uruguayan rugby union players
Uruguay international rugby union players
Rugby union players from Montevideo
Rugby union fly-halves
Rugby union fullbacks
Uruguayan expatriate sportspeople in Italy
Uruguayan expatriate rugby union players
Expatriate rugby union players in Italy